Cross-site may refer to the following network security exploits:
Cross-site cooking
Cross-site request forgery
Cross-site scripting
Cross-site tracing